For the state pageant affiliated with Miss Teen USA, see Miss Ohio Teen USA

The Miss Ohio's Outstanding Teen competition is the pageant that selects the representative for the U.S. state of Ohio in the Miss America's Outstanding Teen pageant.

Cassandra Kurek of Bucyrus won the title of Miss Ohio's Outstanding Teen on June 15, 2022 at the Renaissance Theater in Mansfield, Ohio. She competed for the title of Miss America's Outstanding Teen 2023 at the Hyatt Regency Dallas in Dallas, Texas on August 12, 2022.

Results summary 
The following is a visual summary of the past results of Miss Ohio's Outstanding Teen titleholders presented in the table below. The year in parentheses indicates year of the Miss America's Outstanding Teen competition in which the placement and/or award was garnered.

Placements

 Top 10: Cecili Weber (2011)
 Top 15: Ali Nance (2006), Kelsey Barrett (2012)

Awards

Preliminary awards
 Preliminary Evening Wear/On Stage Question: Cecili Weber (2011)

Winners

References

External links
 Official website

Ohio
Ohio culture
Women in Ohio
Annual events in Ohio